The 2010 United States Senate election in Hawaii took place on November 2, 2010 concurrently with elections to the United States Senate in other states as well as elections to the United States House of Representatives and various state and local elections. The primary elections were held on September 18, 2010. Incumbent Senator Daniel Inouye, also the President pro tempore, secured the Democratic nomination with over 88 percent of the vote over his sole challenger, businessman Andy Woerner, while former state legislator (and Inouye's 2004 opponent) Campbell Cavasso won the Republican nomination with two-thirds of the primary vote.

Focuses of the campaign included Inouye's seniority and ability to direct federal resources to the state, as well as Cavasso's emphases on change and fiscal responsibility. Polling found Inouye with a large lead, although one poll gave the Democrat a lead of only thirteen points, greatly underestimating his share of the vote. Inouye won re-election to his ninth and final term, with nearly 75 percent of the vote to Cavasso's 21.6 percent. The Senator would not serve out his ninth term, as he died in December 2012 and was replaced by appointed then-Lieutenant governor Brian Schatz.

Background 
Hawaii last elected a Republican Senator in 1970, and its current delegation to the United States Congress currently consists entirely of Democrats. Democrats have also won Hawaii's electoral votes in every presidential election since Ronald Reagan's landslide election in 1984. The exceptions at the time were then-Governor Linda Lingle (who was serving her second and final term) and then-U.S. Representative Charles Djou, both of whom are Republicans.

Democratic primary

Candidates 
 Daniel Inouye, incumbent U.S. Senator
 Andy Woerner, businessman

Results

Republican primary

Candidates 
 Campbell Cavasso, former State Representative, candidate for Lieutenant Governor in 2002, and nominee for U.S. Senate in 2004
 Eddie Pirkowski, businessman and U.S. Senate candidate in the 2006 primary
 John Roco

Results

General election

Candidates 
 Democratic: Daniel Inouye
 Republican: Campbell Cavasso
 Green: Jim Brewer
 Libertarian: Lloyd Mallan
 Independent: Jeff Jarrett

Predictions

Campaign 
The death of longtime U.S. Senator Robert C. Byrd allowed Inouye to become the President pro tempore and Chairman of the United States Senate Committee on Appropriations. He made no apologies for bringing home as much federal money as he can, despite Republican insistence that the U.S. government taxes and spends too much, a stance he calls a "nice gimmick." The Maui News endorsed his re-election.

Cavasso, the 2004 nominee, won the Republican primary again, and ran on a platform of change and is emphasizing the need for a balanced budget. Inouye, who defeated Cavasso in 2004 by 52 percentage points, released TV ads that refer to himself simply as "Dan". The senator is said to be "working" for Hawaii's transportation, high-tech economy, education and other needs.

Polling 
A Rasmussen Reports poll of 500 likely voters conducted on October 13 gave Inouye only a thirteen-point lead over Cavasso, and found the Republican with a modest lead among independent voters. However, the poll would ultimately miss the final margin by forty percentage points. Fivethirtyeights Nate Silver awarded the Rasmussen poll his "worst poll award", citing it as evidence of the pollster's bias against Democratic candidates and observing that it was, as of November 2010, the largest error of any electoral poll in the Fivethirtyeight databases going back to 1998.

Fundraising

Results

References

External links 
 Hawaii Office of Elections
 U.S. Congress candidates for Hawaii at Project Vote Smart
 Hawaii U.S. Senate from OurCampaigns.com
 Campaign contributions from Open Secrets
 2010 Hawaii Senate General Election: All Head-to-Head Matchups graph of multiple polls from Pollster.com
 Election 2010: Hawaii Senate from Rasmussen Reports
 Hawaii Senate from Real Clear Politics
 2010 Hawaii Senate Race from CQ Politics
 Race profile from The New York Times

Official campaign websites
 Campbell Cavasso for U.S. Senate
 Daniel Inouye U.S. Senator
 Jeff Jarrett for Hawaii, US Senate
 Lloyd Mallan for U.S. Senate 
 Eddie Pirkowski for U.S. Senate
 John Roco for U.S. Senator
 Andy Woerner for U.S. Senate

United States Senate
Hawaii
2010
Daniel Inouye